Lego Icons (formerly known as Lego Creator Expert) is a series of Lego construction toys aimed at a demographic of adolescents and adults. Beginning in 2000 without an established logo or icon, Icons features models such as aircraft, sculptures, and world buildings, selling as exclusives with numerous specialized elements and complex building techniques. Icons is considered a challenge to both the target audience and Lego designers. All Icons sets are classified into specified sub-themes; however, the entirety of Icons is classified as a sub-theme of Lego Creator.

Overview

Background
Advanced Lego models began being featured in the mid-1980s under the Lego Model Team subtheme (a subtheme of Lego System) and were discontinued in 1999 (with the exception of a re-release in 2004). Future advanced models received packaging without a logo and sold as Lego exclusives, beginning with the Statue of Liberty set in 2000. In this timeframe, multiple subthemes were released, such as the Modular Buildings, a series of resident, retail, and restaurant buildings introduced in 2007; and Winter Village Collection, a series of winter-holiday themed models, sometimes delving into deep fiction, introduced in 2009.

Creator Expert
In 2013, advanced models were officially classified as under Lego Creator Expert, a subtheme of Lego Creator, and received their own logo (which was updated multiple times in the future), beginning with the Palace Cinema modular building. This established theme of advanced models was considered to help shape Creator Expert's reputation for unorthodox techniques and distant design from typical models, with old exclusives receiving updated packaging and being merged into the newly created subtheme.

Retirement of branding
In 2020, The Lego Group announced that they will be retiring the Lego Creator Expert branding and replace it with 18+. The Lego Group cited the reason as to make it easier for adults to see which sets were meant for their age range. The Lego Creator Expert theme remains, however, boxes do not feature the logo and feature an all-black design.

In 2022, The Lego Group announced the Lego Creator Expert theme will rebranded as Lego Icons in June 2022 and will be on packaging on 1 January 2023.

Sub-themes
Even though most sub-themes are not official and are rather classified by the majority of the Lego community, some, such as the Modular Buildings, are officially classified and recognized by the Lego company.

Aircraft and Sculptures
In the early 2000s, Lego created various uncategorized exclusive sets relating to aircraft and sculptures, beginning with the Statue of Liberty and Sopwith Camel sets, which eventually evolved into sub-themes themselves. These sets featured large-scale sculptures and planes based on real-world aircraft, such as a model based on the Wright Flyer.

While the Sculptures sub-theme ended shortly one year after its debut, the Aircraft sub-theme continued; with three consecutive sets from 2001 to 2003 and two sets in 2006 and 2012, where the subtheme officially ended with an overhaul of the original Sopwith Camel set.

World Buildings
In the early-to-mid-2000s, more sub-themes were created. World Buildings, a sub-theme centered on recreating famous landmarks (similar to Lego Architecture) began with a set depicting the Eiffel Tower. The sub-theme has continued on, with releases such as the Old Trafford—Manchester United, Colosseum and Real Madrid – Santiago Bernabéu Stadium sets.

Landmark
In November 2022, Eiffel tower was released on 25 November 2022. The largest consists 10,001 pieces.

Modular Buildings

In 2007, Lego released the Café Corner modular building. The set depicted a near 2,000 piece, three-story structure that gave the builder the option to remove individual floors to access the interior (which was empty) accompanied by minifigures and semi-complex building techniques. In the following time, one set was released consecutively each year mirroring the original design of the Cafe Corner, creating an official sub-theme and rapidly gaining popularity amongst its target audience of adults and teenagers with its assortment of retail, real estate, eatery, office, and other buildings, becoming one of the most renowned Creator Expert subthemes.

On 27 November 2020, the 2021 modular building was revealed as being a large three-story police station with a donut shop and newspaper stand on the sides. Released on 1 January 2021, it is the sixteenth set in the Modular Building line. The side of the building features a large poster for "Soap 'n' Suds", a reference to the laundromat featured in the Brick Bank set.

Vehicles
In 2008, an exclusive model was released depicting a Volkswagen Beetle 1960 'Charlotte' model. In following years, numerous large-scale sets mimicking real-life motor vehicles were released such as the Volkswagen T1 Camper Van, James Bond Aston Martin DB5, and the Fiat 500. Since 2014, at least one set has been released every year, therefore beginning an organized sub-theme. In 2016, Lego introduced a re-release of the Volkswagen Beetle that was released in 2008. The sub-theme continued on with the release of the Porsche 911, a two-door 2+2 high performance rear-engined sports car, in 2021. In 2022, Vespa 125 was released on 1 March 2022. Back to the Future Time Machine was released on 1 April 2022 and based on the Back to the Future DeLorean time machine. Chevrolet Camaro Z28 was released on 1 August 2022. In 2023, Land Rover Defender 90 will be released on 1 April 2023.

Winter Village Collection
In 2009, a sub-theme named Winter Village Collection was introduced, focusing on winter-holiday themed sets. Since 2009, Lego has been releasing one set every year such as the Winter Village Market, Santa's Workshop, and the Winter Village Fire Station. In 2015, Lego introduced a re-release of the Winter Village Toy Shop that was released in 2009. The sub-theme continued on with the release of the Elf Club House in 2020. In 2022, Lego introduced a Holiday Main Street which was released in October 2022.

Fairground Collection 
In 2009, Lego released the Grand Carousel, marking the start of a series of sets depicting attractions found in amusement parks such as the ferris wheel and the roller coaster. All sets offer the builder the option to use additional Power Function or Powered Up elements to enhance the playability of the set such as automation, music, and sound effects. In 2020, Lego released the Haunted House, featuring the sub-theme's name, Fairground Collection, for the first time, thereby making the sub-theme official. In 2022, Loop Coaster will be released in July 2022.

Botanical Collection
In 2020, Lego announced that a sub-theme named Botanical Collection would be introduced with two sets to be released on 2 January 2021. The two sets are Flower Bouquet and Bonsai Tree. 

On 2 May 2021, Lego revealed the Bird of Paradise set to be released on 1 June 2021. With 1,173 pieces, it is the largest Botanical Collection set. On 13 April 2022, Lego revealed the Orchid and Succulents sets to be released on 1 May 2022.

In 2023, Lego revealed the Wildflower Bouquet set and Dried Flower Centrepiece set were be released on 1 February 2023. Lego designers Milan Madge and Chris McVeigh explained the design of the individual flowers. Milan Madge explained, "It's a little bit of both. Sometimes there is a perfect element that comes along that just works for a specific type of flower, and then we build the flower around it. Other times we're looking to create a specific flower, we go and see what elements we have that can make it really work and stand out, like the pirate's hat." Chris McVeigh explained, "I certainly had that with the dried flower centrepiece. With the rose, I started with the mud guards, and I really liked that technique. But I was looking for an element that could curve nicely over that. I went through quite a few expressions and none of them felt right. Then I found this great new shell element and it just made everything come together. It literally clicked, I guess! So yes, it's a bit of finding an element that you can turn into a great flower and a bit of finding the elements that already exist then building the flower that you want to build."

Other sub-themes
Other sub-themes include Adidas, Castle System, Trains (sets depicting various types of trains), Maersk, Vestas, Licensed, Space (a small amount of sets revolving around spacecraft, also including real-life models) and Space System.

Miscellaneous
In May 2021, a set based on Titanic from the replica of the Titanic was released in November 2021. The set consists of 9,090 pieces.

In May 2021, Everyone is Awesome was released in May 2021. The set consists of 346 pieces and 11 minifigures.

In 2022, a set based on Optimus Prime from the Transformers franchise was released in June 2022. The set consists of 1,508 pieces. Lego designer Joseph Patrick Kyde commented, "This idea came about because two toy companies were able to say, look, we have this amazing icon of pop culture and we’re going to work together to try and give Optimus Prime a new form that he hasn’t really had before," and continued, "It’s a testament to the importance of the Transformers brand. It’s such a strong icon that everyone on both sides wanted to make this happen for the fans. We’re all so excited about it."

In 2023, Rivendell will be released on 8 March 2023 and based on The Lord of the Rings film trilogy. The largest set consists of 6,167 pieces with 15 minifigures. The largest set included 3 sections. The largest set included Lego minifigures of Frodo Baggins, Samwise Gamgee, Merriadoc “Merry” Brandybuck, Peregrin “Pippin” Took, Legolas, Gimli, Boromir, Aragorn, Elrond, Arwen, Bilbo Baggins, elves and Gloin. Lego Design Master, Mike Psaiki explained, “We know many of our fans have been anticipating a set like this for a long-time – but a great LEGO The Lord of the Rings set is never late, it arrives precisely when it means to! It was important to us that we created something really special in this recreation of Rivendell. We aimed to add as much detail as possible and create an engaging experience throughout the build to delight fans recreating scenes or proudly displaying Elrond’s home. We are really pleased with the final design and how we have brought Rivendell to life in brick form.” Lego designers Mike Psiaki, Wes Talbott, Chris Perron and Ashwin Visser discussed the development of Rivendell (set number: 10316) and explained, “For the development of this, we’re collaborating with Warner Brothers,” said Mike. “They’re the ones that made the Hobbit movies, and then I’m not an expert on this, I guess they currently own the rights to the Lord of the Rings film trilogy. They were quite good to work with. They have a good understanding of the limitations and capabilities of LEGO bricks. And so a lot of the suggestions we made, they’re very much on board with. They gave us access to a lot of great reference material from production – a lot of images that we could go through. So yeah, it was a super great collaboration, we didn’t work directly with anyone that had done any of the production design in the original film trilogy, which could have been awesome. But they had plenty of resources for us to get what we needed to make this model as authentic as it is.”

Design

Challenges
Icons designer Jamie Berard has commented multiple times on the challenges of set design. The Sydney Opera House set was mentioned as one of the most difficult sets to design, and past attempts had always resulted in failure.

Prior to that, Jamie Berard also mentioned Green Grocer was a difficult model to design, and became one of his favorites due to the set's result.

Café Corner was also commented as a difficult model to design due to piece limitation. The designer, Jamie Berard, wanted to add a bicycle piece into the set but the machine was temporarily broken, and he also had to work with instruction designers to implement set techniques onto the instructions since most were different from regular set design.

Reception
Fairly high reception has been provided to Icons. Newsweek praised the Taj Mahal set, due to its design, construction, and high piece count. Also, a reviewer named Joe Meno pointed out that the Green Grocer modular building had clear instructions and "so many fun surprises and tricks used in the model."

In March 2022, The Lego Group reported that the Lego City, Lego Technic, Lego Icons, Lego Harry Potter and Lego Star Wars themes had earned for the full year of 2021. Revenue for the year grew 27 percent versus 2020 to DKK 55.3 billion and consumer sales grew 22 percent over the same period, outpacing the toy industry and driving market share growth globally and in largest markets.

On 28 September 2022, The Lego Group reported that the Lego Star Wars, Lego Technic, Lego Icons (formerly Creator Expert), Lego City, Lego Harry Potter and Lego Friends themes had earned for the six months ending 30 June 2022. Revenue for the period grew 17 percent to DKK 27.0 billion compared with the same period in 2021, driven by strong demand. Consumer sales grew 13 percent, significantly ahead of the toy industry, contributing to global market share growth.

In February 2023, Eiffel Tower, Titanic, Colosseum and Taj Mahal were listed on the "The biggest LEGO sets of all time" by Lego fansite Brick Fanatics.

In March 2023, The Lego Group reported that the Lego City, Lego Technic, Lego Icons, Lego Harry Potter and Lego Star Wars themes had earned for the full year of 2022. Revenue for the year grew 17 percent to DKK 64.6 billion and consumer sales grew 12 percent in 2022, achieving growth in all major market groups with especially strong performance in the Americas and Western Europe.

Award and nominations
In 2019, Roller Coaster set was awarded "Toy of the Year" and also "Playset of the Year" by the Toy Association.

In 2022, Flower Bouquet (set number: 10280) was awarded "Toy of the Year" and also "Grown-Up Toy of the Year" by the Toy Association. Everyone is Awesome (set number: 40516) was awarded "Toy of the Year" and also "Specialty Toy of the Year" by the Toy Association. Everyone is Awesome (set number: 40516) also won British LGBT Awards for 2022.

In 2022, adidas Originals Superstar (set number: 10282) was awarded "Best Licensed Product“ in the category "Toys, Games, Novelties (ages 8 and up)" by Licensing International in Las Vegas.

Categorisation Debate
There has been controversy in the Lego community amongst which sets are considered a part of Creator Expert, and, if so, which sub-theme.

In the Winter Village Collection sub-theme, there has been a dispute whether Holiday Train is a part of the sub-theme. Some of the Lego community argues it lacks being in consecutive order with the sets from 2009 to 2019, while the rest of the community argues it still sparks a holiday atmosphere and, therefore, should be included in the sub-theme.

In the Modular Buildings sub-theme, there was a long-term debate with the Market Street modular building. The debate was whether it was a part of the sub-theme, matching all of the characteristics of a modular building, yet being targeted toward lower age, lower piece count and is categorized as "Factory" as it was designed by a fan. However, the debate has thought to come to an end after Lego announced it as part of their modular building line in their 10-year anniversary celebration.

See also
Lego Architecture
Lego Creator
Lego Modular Buildings

References

External links 
 Official website

Lego themes
Products introduced in 2000